Playground Music Scandinavia AB (PGM) is Scandinavia’s biggest independent record company and distributor founded in 1999. The company operates in Scandinavia with offices in Sweden, Denmark, Finland, Norway, and with local distribution partners in Estonia, Latvia, Lithuania, and Iceland. 
Jonas Sjöström has been the owner of the company since 2010. As a record company, Playground Music does not focus on a specific genre, but different genres of rock and pop have been prominent in the company catalog.
Playground Music also represents several international independent labels in Scandinavia such as Beggars Banquet, 4AD, Domino, Matador, XL Recordings, Mute, Cooking Vinyl, Secretly Canadian, City Slang, Ninja Tune, Ignition and Epitaph.

History
Playground Music Scandinavia was founded in 1999 after Jonas Sjöström and several colleagues left the record company MNW (Music Network Corps AB) in protest of their new owners. From the start, Playground Music set up offices in Sweden, Norway, Denmark and Finland. Of the company's first direct signings, The Rasmus managed to launch a successful international career with the release of their album Dead Letters (2003). The same year, the company acquired Ace of Base's complete musical catalog with the acquisition of the Danish record label Mega Records. In 2006, the company bought the Swedish label Diesel Music, acquiring the catalog of artists such as Lisa Nilsson, Koop, Eagle-Eye Cherry, Mauro Scocco and Titiyo. In 2010, the main shareholder of the company Edel Music Germany sold their share of the company to Jonas Sjöström, thereby making him the sole owner of Playground Music Scandinavia.

Selected artists
Artists currently signed to Playground Music include:
Ace of Base
Smith & Thell
José González
Agnes
Leila K
Ken Ring
Eagle-Eye Cherry
Miss Li
Koop
Lisa Nilsson
The Rasmus
Mando Diao

Examples of artists distributed by Playground Music:
 Adele
 The xx
 Poets Of The Fall
 The Prodigy
 Cat Power
 Marilyn Manson
 Bon Iver
 Apulanta
 Mike Sheridan
 Arctic Monkeys
 M83

References

External links
 Official site

Danish record labels
Record labels established in 1999
Rock record labels
Pop record labels
The Rasmus
IFPI members
1999 establishments in Sweden